"Gabriel-Ernest" is a 1909 short story by British writer H. H. Munro, better known as Saki.  The story was included in The Westminster Gazette and appears in the collection Reginald in Russia published by Methuen & Co. in 1910.

Summary
"Gabriel-Ernest" starts with a warning: "There is a wild beast in your woods..."  As the story progresses, we learn from that Gabriel is indeed wild, feral – a werewolf in fact.  The story uses the idea of lycanthropy as a metaphor for adolescence.  The story's climax is when Gabriel is revealed to have taken a small child home from Sunday school. A pursuit ensues but Gabriel and the child disappear near a river.  The only items found are the clothes of Gabriel and the two are never seen again.

Reprints

The Supernatural Reader, ed. Groff Conklin & Lucy Conklin, London: World/WDL Books 1958
Alone By Night, ed. Michael & Don Congdon, Ballantine 1962
Fantasy: Shapes of Things Unknown, ed. Edmund J. Farrell, Thomas E. Gage, John Pfordresher & Raymond J. Rodrigues, Scott, Foresman 1974
Quickie Thrillers, ed.  Arthur Liebman, Pocket Books 1975
Deadly Nightshade, ed. Peter Haining, London: Gollancz 1977
Shape Shifters, ed. Jane Yolen, Seabury Press 1978
Werewolf!, ed. Bill Pronzini, Arbor 1979
Horror Stories, ed. Susan Price, Kingfisher 1995
The Literary Werewolf: An Anthology, ed. Charlotte F. Otten, Syracuse University Press 2002
Classic Horror Stories, ed. Charles A. Coulombe, Globe Pequot Press/The Lyons Press 2003
Unnatural Creatures, ed. Neil Gaiman, HarperCollins Publishers 2013

External links
 
 Reginald in Russia

1914 short stories
Works by Saki
Werewolf written fiction